Gavião Peixoto is a municipality in the state of São Paulo in Brazil. The population is 4,815 (2020 est.) in an area of 244 km². The elevation is 515 m.

The Brazilian aircraft manufacturer Embraer has a production plant at Gavião Peixoto Aerodrome, where major components are manufactured and flight testing is conducted. The Aerodrome has the longest runway in the Americas and fourth longest in the world.

References 

Municipalities in São Paulo (state)